These are the full results of the athletics competition at the 2014 South American Games which took place between March 13 and March 16, 2014 in Santiago, Chile.

Men's results

100 meters

Heats – March 14Wind:Heat 1: +1.0 m/s, Heat 2: +1.1 m/s

Final – March 14Wind:+1.1 m/s

200 meters

Heats – March 15Wind:Heat 1: -0.1 m/s, Heat 2: -1.9 m/s

Final – March 15Wind:-1.0 m/s

400 meters

Heats – March 13

Final – March 14

800 meters
March 16

1500 meters
March 14

5000 meters
March 16

10,000 meters
March 13

110 meters hurdles

Heats – March 14Wind:Heat 1: -1.3 m/s, Heat 2: -1.6 m/s

Final – March 14Wind:+0.5 m/s

400 meters hurdles
March 15

3000 meters steeplechase
March 16

4 x 100 meters relay
March 15

4 x 400 meters relay
March 16

20,000 meters walk
March 15

High jump
March 15

Pole vault
March 13

Long jump
March 14

Triple jump
March 16

Shot put
March 15

Discus throw
March 16

Hammer throw
March 14

Javelin throw
March 13

Decathlon
March 14–15

Women's results

100 meters

Heats – March 14Wind:Heat 1: -0.8 m/s, Heat 2: -0.6 m/s

Final – March 14Wind:+1.1 m/s

200 meters

Heats – March 15Wind:Heat 1: -0.6 m/s, Heat 2: -0.2 m/s

Final – March 15Wind:-0.4 m/s

400 meters
March 14

800 meters
March 16

1500 meters
March 14

5000 meters
March 15

10,000 meters
March 13

100 meters hurdles
March 14Wind: -1.6 m/s

400 meters hurdles
March 15

3000 meters steeplechase
March 16

4 x 100 meters relay
March 15

4 x 400 meters relay
March 16

20,000 meters walk
March 13

High jump
March 16

Pole vault
March 14

Long jump
March 13

Triple jump
March 15

Shot put
March 16

Discus throw
March 15

Hammer throw
March 13

Javelin throw
March 14

Heptathlon
March 14–15

References

Athletics at the 2014 South American Games
2014